The daf Bama Music Awards is an international multicultural music award show presented by Daf Entertainment based in Hamburg, Germany. It has been created to honor artists from all over the world and at the same time unite the world with something as beautiful as music and is meant to immortalize creativity, unity and enjoyment among the global music lovers until the end of time.

2002
Emma Milan for A mis dos Homeros — Poetas del Tango (Long Distance 3073692)

2003
 Manu Theron and Lo còr de la plana for Es lo titre 
 Parisa and L'ensemble Dastan for Shoorideh (Network 24 253/Harmonia Mundi)

2004
Sivan Perwer for Min bêriya te kiriye

2005
Yann-Fanch Kemener for Ann Dorn

2006
 Pura Fé for Tuscarora Nation Blues

2007
 Marcel Khalifé for Taqasim

2008
 A Filetta for Bracanà
 Toumani Diabaté for The Mandé Variations

2009
 René Lacaille for Cordéon Kaméléon
 Tinariwen for Imidiwan: Companions

See also
Awards for world music

References

World Music
World music awards